Hauptwil railway station is a railway station in Hauptwil-Gottshaus, in the Swiss canton of Thurgau. It is an intermediate stop on the Sulgen–Gossau line.

Services 
Hauptwil is served by the S5 of the St. Gallen S-Bahn:

References

External links 
 
 

Railway stations in the canton of Thurgau
Swiss Federal Railways stations